Sabr  (literally 'endurance' or more accurately 'perseverance' and 'persistence') is one of the two parts of faith (the other being shukr) in Islam.  It teaches to remain spiritually steadfast and to keep doing good actions in the personal and collective domain, specifically when facing opposition or encountering problems, setbacks, or unexpected and unwanted results. It is patience in the face of all unexpected and unwanted outcomes.

Etymology
Arabic lexicographers suggest that the root ṣ-b-r, of which ṣabr is the nominalization, means to bind or restrain. The word ṣabr has a special technical application in the expression yamīn aṣ-ṣabr (يمين الصبر), which refers to perjury.

In the Quran

In the Quran, words that are derived from the root ṣ-b-r occur frequently, with the general meaning of persisting on the right path when under adverse circumstance, whether internal or external, personal or collective. For example, Muhammad is told to be patient like the Apostles of God before him;. The Qur'an promises those who face difficulty and yet persist on the right path, a double reward. The concept is also in jihad, where it is translated as "endurance" or "tenacity". It is also used when God commands Muslims to serve Him: XIX, 66, "Serve Him and persevere in His service.". Sometimes ṣabr is associated with the salāt. According to the Qur'an commentators, ṣabr in these passages is synonymous with fasting, as the month of Ramadan was given the name s̲h̲ahr ṣabr (meaning month of patience).

The word is found with the meaning resignation(acceptance), for example in the sura of Yusuf, Yaqub(As.), on hearing of the death of his son, says "[My best course is] fitting resignation(acceptance)", where resignation(acceptance) is the most appropriate translation for sabar. The Quran also uses the adjective ṣabbār. This concept is related to shukr (meaning gratitude).

In Quran there is usually a close connection between being patiently persisting in doing right and expecting relief
or deliverance from God (tawakkul). Thus Muhammad is told to be "patient till your Lord decides, for you are in Our sight".

Hadiths on significance of ṣabr

Abu Yahya Suhaib b. Sinan said that Muhammad said: "Wondrous are the believer's affairs. For him there is good in all his affairs, and this is so only for the believer. When something pleasing happens to him, he is grateful, and that is good for him; and when something displeasing happens to him, he is enduring (ṣabr), and that is good for him." ( Muslim )

Muhammad is reported to have said, "No one had ever been given anything better than ṣabr."  From Sahih Bukhari and Sahih Muslim

Abu Musa al-Ashari reported that Muhammad said, "When a son of a servant of Allah dies, Allah Says to the angels, 'Have you taken the son of My servant?'  They say, 'Yes.' Then Allah Says, 'Have you taken the fruit of his heart?'  They say, 'Yes.'  Allah Says, 'What has My servant said?'  They say, 'He has praised You and said, ʾinnā li-llāhi wa-ʾinnā ʾilaihi rājiʿūn (To Allah we belong and to Him is our return). Then Allah Says, 'Build a house for My servant in Paradise and call it the house of praise.'" From Tirmidhi, Musnad Ahmad and ibn Habban.

Quotes pertaining to ṣabr

Umar bin Khattab said, "We considered the best part of our lives to be that in which there was ṣabr."  Related by al-Bukhārī (1 l/303) in taʿlīq form, and it has been related in connected form by Imām Ahmad in az-Zuhd with a Ṣaḥīḥ ʾisnād – as al-Ḥāfiẓ Ibn Hajar mentioned in Fatḥ al-Bārīʾ (11/303).

Ali said, "Indeed ṣabr is from ʾīmān (faith). Its position is like that of the head with respect to the rest of the body." Then he raised his voice and said, "Verily, there is no ʾīmān (faith) for the one who has no ṣabr."  Related by Hibat Allāh ibn al-Ḥasan al-Lālakāʾī in Sharḥ ʾuṣūl ʾiʿtiqād ʾahl as-sunnah wa-al-jamāʿah (no. 1659), al-Bayhaqī in Shuʿūb al-ʾīmān and Abī Shaybān in Kitāb al-ʾīmān (no. 130), with a slightly different wording.

Imam Ahmad said, "Allāh has mentioned ṣabr (patient perseverance) in over ninety places in His Book (Quran)."   Related by Ibn al-Qayyim in Madārij as-Sālikīn (2/152).

Classification
Many Muslim scholars have tried to classify and give examples of ṣabr. According to the Encyclopaedia of Islam ṣabr is of two kinds:
physical, like the endurance of physical troubles, whether active (such as performing difficult tasks) or passive (such as suffering illnesses), and
the spiritual, such as renunciation in face of natural impulses.

Fakh̲r al-Dīn al-Rāzī distinguishes four kinds:
intellectual endurance (for example in disputed points in religious dogma),
endurance in completing tasks one is bound or recommended to do by Islamic law (such as fasting),
being steadfast in refraining from forbidden activities, and
resignation in times of calamity.

He also gives an application of the concept, Muṣābara, in which ones refrains from taking revenge from one's fellow-creature (like neighbors, People of the Book).

Al-Ghazali said that ṣabr consisted of three parts:  maʿrifa (the tree), ḥāl (branches) and  ʿamal (the fruits).

In addition to the above, Sabr was also classified as thus:

"Sabr in time of afflictions, that is; to bear the bitterness of troubles and misfortunes.

Sabr in obedience of Allah, that is; to bear the difficulty of performing what we are commanded.

Sabr in guarding against sins, that is;to stop and refrain from committing sins despite their attraction".

Sabr in practice
According to Qur'an, a practical example of Sabr was described and stated as thus:

Sabirun
Those who possess ṣabr to a certain extent are called ṣābirūn. Out of the three classes of beings (jinn, angels, and mankind), man alone may possess  ṣabr. This is because the animals are entirely governed by their desires and impulses; and the angels are completely occupied by their longing for God, so they have no desires and thus need no ṣabr to overcome them. In man, however, the two impulses (that of desire and that of spirituality) are fighting, where the former is kindled by Satan and the latter by the angels.

Among mankind, there are the pious, who have attained ṣabr by overcoming their animal instincts, called siddiqūn, while some still struggle in this task. Sābirūn are to remain steadfast not only in health and prosperity (where their ṣabr is to be used as gratitude to God) but also in the performance of religious obligations, in refraining from forbidden things and in the event of uncontrollable calamities.

Achieving Sabr
"The true realisation of any moral virtue occurs when it becomes one’s second nature, such that the person acts according to it without much difficulty or pretention". 
Another way to achieve this, is to act ‘as if’ one possesses the virtue, as it was quoted by Imam Ali; “If you are not tolerant, put on the garb of tolerance, because it rarely happens that one imitates a people and does not soon become one of them.” 
Thus, Practice and consistency help one develop this virtue as a matter of time.

See also 

 Political quietism in Islam

Notes

References
Giese, Alma; Reinhart, A.K. "S̲h̲ukr". Encyclopaedia of Islam. Edited by: P. Bearman, Th. Bianquis, C.E. Bosworth, E. van Donzel and W.P. Heinrichs. Brill, 2008. Brill Online. 29 April 2008

Watt, William Montgomery. "Suffering in Sunnite Islam". Studia Islamica, no. 50 (1979), p. 5-19.
Wensinck, A.J. "Ṣabr". Encyclopaedia of Islam. Edited by: P. Bearman, Th. Bianquis, C.E. Bosworth, E. van Donzel and W. P. Heinrichs. Brill, 2008. Brill Online. 29 April 2008

External links 
  Sabar ki Dua 
 Sabar Quotes - ReadBeach.com

Islamic terminology